The Sandpebbles were an American R&B vocal group composed of Calvin White, Andrea Bolden, and Lonzine Wright. They recorded for Calla Records, and had one major pop hit in the U.S., "Love Power", which hit #14 on the Billboard Black Singles chart in 1967 and #22 on the Billboard Hot 100 chart the following year. An album containing their complete recorded output was issued on compact disc in 2000.

The Sandpebbles are considered one-hit wonders due to "Love Power" having been their only successful pop single. However, their previous release, "Forget It," reached #10 on the Billboard R&B chart (#81 pop) in 1967. 

In 1968, the Sandpebbles left Calla for Cotillion. For legal reasons, they changed their name to C & The Shells. The following year, with producer Jerry (Swamp Dogg) Williams, they hit #28 R&B with "You Are the Circus." By 1970, they were on the minuscule Zanzee label, where they recorded without success. C & The Shells broke up in 1973. 

"Love Power" was revived in 1991 by Luther Vandross in part of a medley called "Power of Love/Love Power." Vandross' version had much more success than the original, going to #4 on the Billboard Hot 100 and spending a week at #1 on the R&B list. It was also recorded by British singer Dusty Springfield for her 1968 album Dusty... Definitely.

References

American rhythm and blues musical groups